Sons In Retirement (SIR) is a fraternal organization of retired men.  It has about 91 branches and 10,000 members  in Northern California and Central California.  SIR was founded in San Mateo, California in 1958  and subsequently incorporated as a non-profit public-benefit corporation.  The organization's purpose is:

'To provide for the welfare of retired men... who are pursuing a common goal, the enjoyment of their later years with dignity and pride... through association with other retired men who also face the particular problems that confront men upon their retirement.' 

The hallmark of the SIR logo is the rooster.

Sources 

SIR Manual 11/9/2010

The latest revision of the manual as of this writing was published February 3, 2021  

By going to this page currently you can get to all the past and present Manuals:  SIR Manual

References 

 Page text.

External links 
 SIR branches in California
 SIR quarterly newsletter

Service organizations based in the United States